Ada may refer to:

Places

Africa
 Ada Foah, a town in Ghana
 Ada (Ghana parliament constituency)
 Ada, Osun, a town in Nigeria

Asia
 Ada, Urmia, a village in West Azerbaijan Province, Iran
 Ada, Karaman, a village in Karaman Province, Turkey

Europe
 Ada, Bosnia and Herzegovina, a village
 Ada, Croatia, a village
 Ada, Serbia, a town and municipality
 Ada Ciganlija or Ada, a river island artificially turned into a peninsula in Belgrade, Serbia

United States 
 Ada, Alabama, an unincorporated community
 Ada County, Idaho
 Ada, Kansas, an unincorporated community
 Ada Township, Michigan
 Ada, Minnesota, a city
 Ada Township, Dickey County, North Dakota
 Ada, Ohio, a village
 Ada, Oklahoma, a city
 Ada, Oregon, an unincorporated community
 Ada Township, Perkins County, South Dakota
 Ada, West Virginia, an unincorporated community
 Ada, Wisconsin, an unincorporated community

Other
 Ada River (disambiguation), various rivers
 523 Ada, an asteroid

Film and television
 Ada TV, a television channel in the Turkish Republic of Northern Cyprus
 Ada (1961 film), a 1961 film by Daniel Mann
Ada (2019 film), a short biopic about Ada Lovelace
 Ada... A Way of Life, a 2008 Bollywood musical by Tanvir Ahmed
 Ada (dog actor), a dog that played Colin on the sitcom Spaced
 Ada, one of the main characters in 1991 movie Armour of God II: Operation Condor

Biology
 Ada (plant), a genus of orchids
 Adenosine deaminase, an enzyme involved in purine metabolism
 Ada (protein), an enzyme induced by treatment of bacterial cells

Computer science
 Ada (programming language), programming language based on Pascal
 Ada (computer virus)

Air travel
 Ada Air, a regional airline based in Tirana, Albania
 Francisco C. Ada Airport, Saipan Island, Northern Mariana Islands

Schools 
 Ada, the National College for Digital Skills, a further education college in Tottenham Hale, London
 Ada High School (Ohio)
 Ada Independent School District, Oklahoma

People
 Ada (name), a feminine given name and a surname, including a list of people and fictional characters
 Ada Lovelace (1815–1852), computer scientist sometimes regarded as the first computer programmer
 Ada of Caria (fl. 377 – 326 BCE), satrap of ancient Caria and adoptive mother of Alexander the Great

Other uses
 List of tropical storms named Ada
 Ada (food), a traditional Kerala delicacy
 Ada, the cryptocurrency of the Cardano blockchain platform
 Ada Bridge, Belgrade, Serbia
 , a cargo vessel built for the London and South Western Railway
 Ada (ship), a wooden ketch, wrecked near Newcastle, New South Wales, Australia
 Ada class, a class of anti-submarine corvettes developed by Turkey
 Ada or Ardor: A Family Chronicle, novel by Vladimir Nabokov
 Dangme language, spoken in Ghana (ISO 639-2 and 639-3 code "ada")
 Ada Health GmbH, a symptom checker app

See also
 ADA (disambiguation)
 Ada regulon, an Escherichia coli adaptive response protein
 Adah (disambiguation)
 Adha (disambiguation)
 Ada'a, a woreda in the Oromia Region of Ethiopia
 Ade (disambiguation)
 USS Little Ada (1864), a steamer captured by the Union Navy during the American Civil War